Victory Contents is a Korean drama production company based in Seoul.

History
source: 

April 4, 2003 - Music Encyclopedia was established.
October 2003 - The company's name was changed to Victory Production Co. (later Victory Production and Company).
January 3, 2004 - Something Happened in Bali (20 episodes) aired on SBS TV.
December 1, 2004 - Stained Glass (18 episodes) aired on SBS TV.
May 17, 2006 - Smile Again (16 episodes) aired on SBS TV.
May 16, 2007 - War of Money (20 episodes) aired on SBS TV.
March 7, 2008 - War of Money: The Original (12 episodes) aired on tvN.
June 23, 2008 - Night After Night (17 episodes) aired on MBC TV.
August 19, 2009 - My Fair Lady (16 episodes) aired on KBS 2TV.
March 31, 2010 - Personal Taste (16 episodes) aired on MBC TV.
October 6, 2010 - Big Thing (24 episodes) aired on SBS TV.
July 11, 2011 - Spy Myung-wol (18 episodes) aired on KBS 2TV.
August 24, 2011 - Can't Lose (18 episodes) aired on MBC TV.
March 19, 2012 - K-POP Extreme Survival (originally 16 episodes but shortened to 14 due to low viewership ratings) aired on Channel A.
May 26, 2012 - Dr. Jin (22 episodes) aired on MBC TV.
November 7, 2012 - Missing You (21 episodes) aired on MBC TV.
April 6, 2013 - Pots of Gold (50 episodes) aired on MBC TV.
October 28, 2013 - Empress Ki (51 episodes) aired on MBC TV.
March 18, 2014 - Wife Scandal (4 episodes) aired on TV Chosun.
July 14, 2014 - Temptation (20 episodes) aired on SBS TV.
November 5, 2014 - Mr. Back (16 episodes) aired on MBC TV.
December 16, 2014 - Initial public offering on the KONEX section of Korea Exchange (210120)
June 16, 2015 - Girls' Love Story (50 episodes) aired on Daum TV Pot and KakaoTV.
March 16, 2016 - Goodbye Mr. Black (20 episodes) aired on MBC TV.
March 28, 2016 - Monster (50 episodes) aired on MBC TV.
July 2016 - The company's name was changed to Victory Contents.
November 21, 2016 - Night Light (20 episodes) aired on MBC TV. 
March 4, 2017 - You Are Too Much (50 episodes) aired on MBC TV.
June 2017 - Acquired pay TV channel Senior TV
August 2017 - Acquired talent agency The Awesome Entertainment
May 22, 2019 - Angel's Last Mission: Love (32 episodes) aired on KBS 2TV.
December 4, 2019 - Woman of 9.9 Billion (32 episodes) aired on KBS 2TV.
May 17, 2020 - Kingmaker: The Change of Destiny (24 episodes) aired on TV Chosun. 
May 25, 2020 - Dinner Mate (32 episodes) aired on MBC TV.
February 15, 2021 - River Where The Moon Rises (20 episodes) aired on KBS 2TV.
June 14, 2021 - At a Distance, Spring Is Green (12 episodes) aired on KBS 2TV.

List of works

Serials

Films

Soundtracks
source:

Notes

References

External links
  
 
 
Victory Contents on Naver Post 
 

Television production companies of South Korea
Companies based in Seoul
Mass media companies established in 2003
2003 establishments in South Korea
Labels distributed by Kakao M
Companies listed on the Korea Exchange
2014 initial public offerings